The Men's keirin competition at the 2018 UCI Track Cycling World Championships was held on 1 March 2018.

Results

First round
The first rider in each heat qualified to the second round, all other riders advanced to the first round repechages.

Heat 1

Heat 2

Heat 3

 Q = qualified to Second round

Heat 4

Heat 5

Heat 6

First round repechage
The winner of each heat qualified to the second round.

Heat 1

Heat 2

Heat 3

 Q = qualified to Second round

Heat 4

Heat 5

Heat 6

Second round
The first three riders in each heat qualify to final 1–6, all other riders advance to final 7–12.

Heat 1

Heat 2

Finals
The finals were started at 20:39.

Small final

Final

References

Men's keirin
UCI Track Cycling World Championships – Men's keirin